Ulotrichopus dinawa is a moth of the  family Erebidae. It is found in New Guinea.

References

Moths described in 1906
Ulotrichopus
Moths of New Guinea